Gregory Gordon may refer to:
Gregory Gordon (lawyer), American scholar of international law
Gregory Gordon (bishop), American Roman Catholic bishop